The Spoiler is a 2011 dark comedy novel written by British author Annalena McAfee. The novel was first published by Harvill Secker on 2 May 2011, with Knopf republishing the book in the United States on 10 April 2012.

Synopsis
The Spoiler is set in London during the 1990s and follows two female newspaper employees. Honor Tait is an eighty-year-old seasoned veteran while Tamara Sim is a new graduate that puts together lists for a gossip newspaper. Tamara is sent to interview Honor, with the intent to dish on her personal life. However the elderly woman is known for being tricky and isn't willing to give up details about her private life without a fight. As the two women clash and each paper is out to get the highest amount of sales, the stakes get higher and more desperate.

Reception
Reviews for The Spoiler have been mostly positive, with the London Evening Standard stating that the novel was "strikingly entertaining". The New York Times positively reviewed the book, calling it "spirited if at times heavy-handed". The Independent and Guardian both praised the novel, with the Guardian remarking that it was a "witty and entertaining debut about two very different worlds of journalism". Entertainment Weekly gave The Spoiler a B+ rating, with NPR calling it "satisfying". The Globe and Mail also positively reviewed The Spoiler.

References 

2011 British novels
Novels set in London
Novels about journalists
Harvill Secker books